Edward Albert Sandford (22 October 1910 – 13 May 1995) was an English footballer who played as an inside forward. During his professional career from 1930 to 1943 he represented West Bromwich Albion, Sheffield United, Morris Commercial and the England national football team.

Career 
Sandford was born in Handsworth, Birmingham. As a youth he played football for Tantany Athletic, Overend Wesley, Birmingham Carriage Works F.C. and Smethwick Highfield. In October 1929, while still an amateur, he joined West Bromwich Albion, the club that his uncle Abe Jones had represented between 1896 and 1901. Sandford turned professional in May 1930 and scored on his senior debut in November of the same year when Albion beat Preston North End 3–2 in a Division Two match. During his first season, he was part of the Albion side that won promotion to the First Division and that also beat Birmingham 2–1 in the 1931 FA Cup Final. In November 1932 he won his only England cap, in a 0–0 draw with Wales at Wrexham. Sandford scored for West Bromwhich Albion in the 1935 FA Cup Final. He joined Sheffield United for £1500 in 1939, before finishing his career with Morris Commercial F.C., retiring in May 1943. He died in Great Barr, Birmingham, in May 1995.

References

External links
 Englandstats.com profile

1910 births
1995 deaths
Footballers from Handsworth, West Midlands
Footballers from Birmingham, West Midlands
English footballers
England international footballers
Association football inside forwards
West Bromwich Albion F.C. players
Sheffield United F.C. players
English Football League players
FA Cup Final players